X Caeli, or Gamma2 Caeli, is a binary star system in the southern constellation of Caelum. The system is moving further away with a heliocentric radial velocity of +6 km/s.

The yellow-white-hued primary, component A, has an apparent magnitude of +6.32 and stellar classification of F2 IV/V, showing mixed traits of an F-type main-sequence star and a subgiant. It is classified as a Delta Scuti-type variable star and its brightness varies from magnitude +6.28 to +6.39 with a period of 3.25 hours. A 2000 observing campaign identified at least six independent pulsation modes for this variation. The companion star, component B, has an apparent magnitude of +9.65 and, as of 2000, is at an angular separation of  along a position angle of 183°.

References

External links
 HR 1653
 Image Gamma2 Caeli

F-type giants
Delta Scuti variables
Binary stars
Caelum
Caeli, Gamma2
Durchmusterung objects
032846
023596
1653
Caeli, X